Mass Effect is a series of action role-playing video games.

Mass effect may also refer to:
 Mass effect (medicine), the effect of a growing mass or tumor
 Mass Effect (video game), the first game in the series